Mr. Pacman is a bitpop/gamewave (or as the band calls themselves, "8-bit hero gangsta rock") band from Denver, Colorado. Described as a performance art project as well as a band, Mr. Pacman's live shows include martial arts fighting with monsters, outrageous 1980s-style retro-futuristic outfits, and their signature Commodore 64-inspired electronic music with a rock attitude. Although most musicians who use the MOS Technology SID chip do so only in the studio, Mr. Pacman uses a SidStation, controlled by his keytar, live on stage, and the Silver Ghost uses a Commodore SX-64 as a bass synthesizer. (Daniel Eriksson, who helped design the SidStation, was the first to use a Sidstation live on stage, at mekke 2000; Goto80 was the first to use a SID chip live onstage at the ECC in 1993.) Many Mr. Pacman songs are based on songs from classic video games, such as the Mega Man series.

Biography
Mr. Pacman started out as a project by film school student Avery Rains in 2001 who rapped over Commodore 64 video game music. After one such performance, some Japanese exchange students remarked, "Mr. Pacman is awesome!". The name stuck, and Mr. Pacman now says he's from "Denver, Japan". A running gag based on this is the intentional use of Engrish in the band's e-mail newsletters . Since 2001, the band has expanded to 4 members, adding first the Silver Ghost, then White Tiger, and finally Cockroach 3030 (now known as Anarchy Dragon).

Denver alternative newspaper Westword named Mr. Pacman "Best Bizarro Fashion/Rock Act" in 2002 as part of its "Best of Denver" awards; Mr. Pacman has not won a Best of Denver since. The Denver Post has put Mr. Pacman on its Top 10 Underground Bands of Colorado list every year since 2002, placing 7th that year, 5th in 2003 & 2004, 8th in 2005 & 14th in 2006. Mr. Pacman played keytar on the Hot IQs track "The New One" in 2004.

In May 2005, the short film "Half Hour of Power" (called a "violent children's show" by the band) was included with the music video "No Ghosts!" and an interview with Mr. Pacman, among other band-related videos, on Dropframe, a local Emmy-winning PBS show featuring indie films. Mr. Pacman currently hosts Extreme Karaoke Challenge Monday nights at 9 PM at the hi-dive, 7 South Broadway in Denver.

Discography

Turbotron EP (2002)

Intro
Turbotron
Pacman Rap (Shout-out by Wesley Willis)
Neurotica
Be the Zero
O.P.A (Original Party Animal)
Welcome to the Future (Sucks)
The End
Girls That Go Boom (featuring Ozzy Osmond)

*Trivia: The cover photo was taken on a karaoke night at Armida's Mexican Restaurant in Denver "just prior to getting kicked out". O.P.A. is a mix of 6 different performances of the song at the Scott Baio Army Fourth of July party; during the instrumental for each, Mr. Pacman chugged a 40-oz. malt liquor.

7" vinyl split with Magicyclops

Mr. Pacman:  Baby's on Fire (Originally by Brian Eno)
Magic Cyclops:  Abracadabra (Originally by Steve Miller Band)

Star Hustler (2003)

Gangsta Pac (Contains a sample from the movie Colors)
(rock) Star Hustler (with Magicyclops)
Pacman Densu (feat. Monotrona)
Lifeless
Pacman Power
Be the Hero (feat. Sara Thorpe; a Fischerspooner-like reinterpretation of "Be the Zero" from Turbotron)
Turbo Attack!
Mr. Pacman International
No Ghosts!
Luxury Car
Pacman Birthday (feat. Monotrona)
The Ninja
Paxcercise (feat. Bebe & Serge; based on "Deflektor" by Ben Daglish)
(porn) Star Hustler (feat. Sara Thorpe & Claudine; an alternate version of "(rock) Star Hustler")
Let's Go! (various video game samples)
Songjacked

*This is an enhanced CD. Included on the disc are the videos for Be the Hero, No Ghosts!, Luxury Car, and Paxcercise. The album was named 2003's Best Local CD of the Year by the Denver Post. The "limo tank" on the cover was a toy designed & built by Greg Hignight. It is said to shoot diamonds and run on Hennessy Private Reserve.

Future projects
Mr. Pacman plans to make 4 total episodes of Half Hour of Power, the first of which premiered at the Denver Visual Music Festival in 2004; each episode will star a different band member. Three new albums are in the works: the heavy metal Crotch Rocket, the Caribbean-flavored Mr. Pacman Goes to Jamaica, & Mr. Pacman's Christmas in Japan. No release dates have been announced yet for any of these.

PacFashion

Since 2002, Mr. Pacman has presented both original fashions, pieces from local designers, and (one year) his collection of Power Rangers monster costumes in the annual PacFashion show. The shows' fashions are inspired by science fiction, anime, and video games, and include musical performances by Mr. Pacman as well as other indie bands.

External links
Official website
"Paxcercise" music video

Rock music groups from Colorado
Musical groups from Denver
American performance artists
Musical groups established in 2001
2001 establishments in Colorado